Kristopher Beech (born February 5, 1981) is a Canadian former professional ice hockey centre who played in the National Hockey League (NHL). Beech was born in Salmon Arm, British Columbia, but grew up in Sicamous, British Columbia.

Playing career
Beech was drafted 7th overall in the 1999 NHL Entry Draft by the Washington Capitals. At the time he was playing for the Calgary Hitmen of the WHL. Beech was traded to the Pittsburgh Penguins in July 2001 with Michal Sivek, Ross Lupaschuk, and future considerations for Jaromir Jagr and Frantisek Kucera.

Beech appeared in 79 games for the Penguins, recording 10 goals and 15 assists for 25 points.  Disappointed with his development, the Penguins traded Beech on September 9, 2005 to the Nashville Predators for a conditional draft pick. Beech returned to the Capitals organization on March 9, 2006, having been traded, along with a first-round pick, for  defenseman Brendan Witt. He was sent down to the Hershey Bears to join their AHL playoff campaign and helped them to a Calder Cup victory against the Milwaukee Admirals.

On January 10, 2008, Beech was claimed off waivers from Columbus by the Vancouver Canucks. However, on January 23, 2008, after just four games with the Canucks in which he recorded one goal and one assist, Beech was subsequently placed on waivers and claimed by the Washington Capitals. Before playing a single game with Washington, Beech was once again placed on waivers, which led to him being re-acquired by the Pittsburgh Penguins, Beech's fourth team in the month of January.

On October 10, 2008, Beech signed a one-year contract with the Swedish Elitserien team HV71. He joined his new team three days later.

On April 28, 2009, Beech was re-signed to a two-year contract extension with HV71. Prior to the 2009–10 season on September 4, 2009, Beech signed a six-week loan contract with HC Genève-Servette. In his eight games with Genève-Servette, he scored two goals. On October 14, 2009, Beech was returned to HV71.

On May 25, 2011, the Finnish club Lukko Rauma announced that Beech signed a one-year contract with the team. Upon completion of the season with Lukko, Beech was again on the move within Europe signing a one-year contract with Czech team HC Pardubice on June 25, 2012. During the 2012–13 season, on December 4, 2012, Beech transferred to join AIK of the Elitserien for the remainder of the season.

In the 2013–14 season, Beech moved to Germany to play in the Deutsche Eishockey Liga with the Straubing Tigers.  He scored 24 points in 36 games, before opting to transfer to the Austrian EBEL league with the Vienna Capitals for their playoff run. On July 3, 2014, Beech decided to remain in the EBEL, signing a one-year contract with HC TWK Innsbruck.

On July 2, 2015, Beech signed a one-year contract with Northern Irish club, the Belfast Giants of the British Elite Ice Hockey League (EIHL).

Personal
During the offseason, Beech is a guest instructor at the Sicamous Hockey School, located in Sicamous, British Columbia.  Since 2017, Beech has worked with various hockey teams and organizations, including the Vancouver Giants and Delta, British Columbia's Delta Hockey Academy, as a mindfulness training coach.

Career statistics

Awards 
 1998-99: Played in CHL Top Prospects Game
 1998-99: Ed Chynoweth Cup winner, Calgary Hitmen (WHL)
 2003-04: Team MVP, Wilkes-Barre/Scranton Penguins (AHL)
 2004-05: Team MVP, Wilkes-Barre/Scranton Penguins (AHL)
 2005-06: Calder Cup winner, Hershey Bears (AHL)
 2008-09: Playoff silver medal, HV71 (SEL)
 2009-10: Swedish Champion, HV71 (SEL)

References

External links

 Kris Beech founded Aimability in 2017.

1981 births
AIK IF players
Belfast Giants players
Calgary Hitmen players
Canadian ice hockey centres
Columbus Blue Jackets players
Genève-Servette HC players
HC Dynamo Pardubice players
Hershey Bears players
HV71 players
Ice hockey people from British Columbia
HC TWK Innsbruck players
Living people
Lukko players
Milwaukee Admirals players
Nashville Predators players
National Hockey League first-round draft picks
People from Salmon Arm
Pittsburgh Penguins players
Straubing Tigers players
Syracuse Crunch players
Vancouver Canucks players
Vienna Capitals players
Washington Capitals draft picks
Washington Capitals players
Wilkes-Barre/Scranton Penguins players
Canadian expatriate ice hockey players in the United States
Canadian expatriate ice hockey players in the Czech Republic
Canadian expatriate ice hockey players in Austria
Canadian expatriate ice hockey players in Finland
Canadian expatriate ice hockey players in Germany
Canadian expatriate ice hockey players in Switzerland
Canadian expatriate ice hockey players in Sweden
Canadian expatriate ice hockey players in Northern Ireland